Safaria is a genus of flies belonging to the family of the Lesser Dung flies.

Species
S. abyssinica Richards, 1951
S. brachyptera Richards, 1966
S. chelata Richards, 1950
S. cornuta (Duda, 1926)
S. forcipata Richards, 1950
S. kistneri Richards, 1968
S. liberiensis Richards, 1968
S. saegeri (Vanschuytbroeck, 1959)

References

Sphaeroceridae
Sphaeroceroidea genera
Diptera of Africa